Susan Brookes (née Walton, born c.1943–44), is an English television chef, broadcaster and writer. During the 1980s and 1990s, she regularly appeared on the ITV daytime magazine show This Morning, cooking recipes for viewers as the programme's resident chef.

Early life and education 
Brookes was born in Settle, then part of the West Riding of Yorkshire, and grew up in nearby Langcliffe (both areas are now in North Yorkshire) as the middle child of eight siblings, with seven brothers. Her father, John (Jack) Ridgway Walton, originally from Manchester, was an engineering specialist in non-woven fabrics. She attended Langcliffe School and Settle High School, where she was banned from cookery classes because she talked too much. Brookes learned to cook at an early age, but had no formal training. She has a degree in politics, philosophy and English.

Career 
Brookes started her career as a teacher, and wrote features for her local newspaper in her spare time. She had her children at a young age, and it was not until she was 35 that Brookes embarked on her television career, before which she had taught English. In 1980, she applied for a job as a researcher, and worked on programmes for Granada Television in Manchester, beginning with Live From Two, followed by The Krypton Factor. Brookes was persuaded to do a screen test with Oenone Williams of Exchange Flags, a lunchtime current affairs programme for the North West of England. She then began to present, appearing on Late Night From Two with Shelley Rohde in 1982. The Liverpool Echo described Brookes on this programme as "Granada's answer to Gloria Hunniford." Brookes also hosted Exchange Flags.

It was Brookes' idea to have a cookery series "about down to earth food, not entertaining or posh food"; she was told she could present it if she did a screen test, which she agreed to. Her first programme, On the Market, ran for four years, from 1983 to 1987, and took her around the North of England. The series, which developed from "Talking Shop", a slot Brookes had on Exchange Flags, focused on seasonal foods and cooking with bargain buys. "The thing that annoys me about cookery programmes is that they are not the real world. They don't deal with the kind of things that go through your mind when you're going round the shops," Brookes commented, prior to the programme starting. "I'm not an expert myself. I just regard myself as a normal run-of-the-mill cook." In 1986, she began presenting Gardener's Calendar Roadshow, a Granada production for Channel 4.

Brookes, a former amateur theatrical, applied to be a producer for ITV's new daytime show This Morning, but was instead chosen to be its resident chef, to her surprise. From the first edition in 1988 onwards, she was a feature on the popular show, and stayed with the programme over ten years. During this period, as her profile rose, she wrote columns for Dalesman and Inside Soap magazines. Brookes also appeared on Yorkshire Television's Tonight, and programmes for the Granada Good Life channel.

In 1995, she was the winner of the Best TV Chef in the World award at the inaugural International Festival of Gastronomy in Deauville, Normandy. It was reported that the judges were impressed by a 10-minute taped item of Brookes, resulting in her beating over 40 other TV chefs from 32 countries. Her prize-winning recipe was chicken supreme with cider and apples, using British ingredients. Commenting on the award, she said: "Fancy an English chef winning a cookery prize in France! I think the British have learnt from the French through holidaying there, but while their cuisine has made us more adventurous as a nation the French have become stuck in an idea that their gastronomy is carved in stone and not to be developed." Brookes was subsequently president of the jury at the contest.

Brookes has authored a number of cookery books, starting with Brookes Cooks This Morning in 1990. The follow-up, Truly Wonderful Puddings and Desserts (1995), made The Times/Dillons Bestsellers lists upon its release. Her third book, Susan Brookes' Yorkshire Kitchen (1996), had a foreword written by playwright Alan Bennett, a fellow resident of the Yorkshire Dales, who wrote, "Susan's recipes are for good, straightforward, tasty stuff with not a lot of time wasted on exotic garnishes or elaborate presentation. Nouvelle cuisine it isn't, thank goodness."

In 1999, she hosted Susan Brookes' Family Recipes on Granada Breeze with her daughter Gilly, in which they solved cooking problems for families. Brookes has since retired, but contributed a recipe to a local school's charity fundraiser book in 2007.

Personal life 
She is married to Warwick Brookes, a retired schoolmaster, and the couple have two daughters. They live in Long Preston, a village in North Yorkshire. In the 1980s, Susan was resident in nearby Giggleswick, the same village as television personality Russell Harty, a family friend who was best man at her wedding. She took part in ITV's documentary The Unforgettable Russell Harty in 2012.

During the 25th anniversary edition of This Morning in October 2013, which featured appearances from former cast members, it was noted that Brookes was unwell, and she did not take part in the programme. However, in November 2022, she made a rare public appearance as a judge at a Halloween party in her village.

Bibliography 

 Brookes Cooks This Morning, Boxtree (1990)
 Truly Wonderful Puddings & Desserts, Hamlyn (1995)
 This Morning Countdown to Christmas (contributor), HarperCollinsPublishers (1995)
 Susan Brookes' Yorkshire Kitchen, Dalesman (1996)
 Get Cooking! with This Morning (with Brian Turner), HarperCollins (1996)
 Susan Brookes' Real Home Cooking, HarperCollins (1998)
 Mrs Brookes' Baker's Dozen, André Deutsch (1999)
 Cobbled Together: A Personal View of Cobbles and Setts in Long Preston, Long Preston Heritage Group (2011)

References

External links 

 BFI Filmography
 Roger Walton and Susan Brookes (née Walton), "Life at Bowerley, in Langcliffe, in the 1940s and 1950s", Journal 2011, North Craven Heritage Trust.

Living people
1940s births
20th-century English non-fiction writers
20th-century English women writers
21st-century English non-fiction writers
21st-century English women writers
English broadcasters
English food writers
English television chefs
English television presenters
Writers from Yorkshire
People from Craven District
Women food writers
British women television presenters
Women chefs
People from Settle, North Yorkshire